Uttam Baliram Rathod  is an Indian politician belonging to the Indian National Congress. He was elected to the Lok Sabha, lower house of the Parliament of India from Hingoli, Maharashtra.

References

External links
 Official biographical sketch in Parliament of India website

1928 births
Lok Sabha members from Maharashtra
Indian National Congress politicians
Living people